Clayton Keller (born July 29, 1998) is an American professional ice hockey forward and alternate captain for the Arizona Coyotes of the National Hockey League (NHL). The Coyotes selected him seventh overall in the 2016 NHL Entry Draft.

Born in Chesterfield, Missouri, and raised in Swansea, Illinois, Keller was part of a group of skilled young hockey players around his age growing up in the St. Louis area. He spent two years attending Shattuck-Saint Mary's before joining the USA Hockey National Team Development Program in 2014, where he set a program record with 189 points in two seasons. While the Windsor Spitfires of the Ontario Hockey League selected him in the 2014 OHL Draft, Keller attended Boston University to play college ice hockey for the Terriers in 2016. In his one season there, he was named the Hockey East Rookie of the Year and won the Tim Taylor Award for the top NCAA Division I rookie. He left Boston University after one season, joining the Coyotes for the end of the  NHL season.

Keller made his postseason debut with Arizona in the 2020 Stanley Cup playoffs, where they were eliminated by the Colorado Avalanche in the second round. He recorded his 200th career point and received his second All-Star Game selection during the  season, but suffered a season-ending leg injury at the end of March.

Early life
Keller was born on July 29, 1998, in Chesterfield, Missouri, and he was raised in Swansea, Illinois by parents Bryan and Kelley Keller. Keller and his younger brother Jake would play hockey in the basement of their family home, the walls of which were painted to look like an ice hockey rink and were decorated with Keller's favorite National Hockey League (NHL) players: Sidney Crosby, Patrick Kane, Pavel Datsyuk, Alexander Ovechkin, and Evgeni Malkin. He became interested in ice hockey at the age of three, when his mother took him to a high school game, and he joined a contingent of other St. Louis-area players around his age, including Luke Opilka, Luke Kunin, and Matthew Tkachuk. In 2010 and 2011, Keller played in the Quebec International Pee-Wee Hockey Tournament with the St. Louis Blues minor ice hockey affiliate.

In 2012, Keller joined the ice hockey team at Shattuck-Saint Mary's, a boarding school in Faribault, Minnesota, and the alma mater of NHL players Sidney Crosby, Jonathan Toews, and Kyle Okposo. He scored 58 goals and recorded 129 points in 60 games during the 2012–13 season. After playing as a center during his first year with Shattuck-Saint Mary's, Keller moved to the wing for the 2013–14 season. After recording 94 goals and 112 assists in two seasons with Shattuck-St. Mary's, winning a national championship in the process, Keller joined the USA Hockey National Team Development Program (NTDP) for the 2014–15 season. After registering 34 goals and 82 points in 60 games that season, Keller added another 37 goals and 107 points in 62 games during the 2015–16 season, the second-highest single-season point total in program history. He spent two seasons in the NTDP, with 71 goals and 118 assists for 189 career points, setting the program record until 2019, when he was surpassed by Jack Hughes.

Playing career

College
As the 2016 NHL Entry Draft approached, Keller had committed to playing college ice hockey for the Boston University Terriers, but he also had the option to play junior ice hockey in Canada, as the Windsor Spitfires of the Ontario Hockey League had selected him in the second round, 40th overall, of the 2014 OHL Draft. Keller was one of seven players from the St. Louis area who were selected in the first round of the 2016 draft, taken seventh overall by the Arizona Coyotes. On August 3, 2016, Keller turned down the Spitfires, choosing instead to attend Boston University.

Keller scored his first collegiate goal in his first game, Boston University's 6–1 season-opening rout of Colgate on October 6, 2016. He was injured during the Terriers' 3–0 win over Northeastern at the start of November, with sophomore Jordan Greenway taking his place as Boston's second-line center in his absence. He missed seven games with the injury, returning to put up two goals and six points in three December games, enough to be named the Hockey East Rookie of the Month. He won the award again in January, when he had five goals and 11 points in nine games, and February, when he had seven goals and 12 points in eight games. Keller finished the season with 19 goals and 40 points in 31 games. In addition to being a unanimous selection to the Hockey East All-Rookie Team, Keller was a Hockey East Second Team All-Star, the Hockey East Rookie of the Year, and the recipient of the Tim Taylor Award for the top NCAA Division I rookie men's ice hockey player.

Despite a late-game goal from Keller, the Terriers were eliminated from the 2017 Hockey East Men's Ice Hockey Tournament in the semifinal round by crosstown rivals Boston College. They received a bid in the 2017 NCAA Division I Men's Ice Hockey Tournament, facing reigning champions North Dakota in the first round. Keller scored the game-winning goal in double overtime against North Dakota, and the Terriers advanced to the Frozen Four, where they lost 3–2 in overtime to Minnesota Duluth.

Professional
Once Keller's freshman season at Boston University concluded, he signed a three-year, entry-level contract with the Coyotes on March 26, 2017. He made his NHL debut the next night, playing against the St. Louis Blues at his hometown stadium, the Scottrade Center. He skated on a line with Alexander Burmistrov and Christian Fischer in the game, which the Coyotes lost 4–1. Keller recorded his first point in his first home game at Gila River Arena, assisting on Alex Goligoski's third-period goal against the Blues. It was the only goal the Coyotes scored in the 3–1 loss. He played in only three games at the end of the  season, recording two assists in the process.

After impressing new coach Rick Tocchet in training camp, Keller started the  season as the right winger on the Coyotes' top offensive line. He scored his first NHL goal in the season opener against the Anaheim Ducks, a game which the Coyotes won 5–4. Although the Coyotes began the season with the worst record in the NHL, going 1–11–1 in the month of October, Keller led all rookies with nine goals and 15 points in that same period, and he was named the NHL Rookie of the Month for doing so. His nine goals were the most of any franchise rookie since Teemu Selanne in March 1993, and his 15 points were the most since Selanne and Keith Tkachuk that same month. After October, however, Keller fell into a 17-game scoring drought from November 6 to December 14. It was broken when he scored on Andrei Vasilevskiy of the Tampa Bay Lightning. His slump continued into January and February 2018, when he recorded only three goals and 12 points. With one goal and three assists on February 15, Keller joined Martin Hanzal and Kyle Turris as the only Coyotes rookies to record a four-point game. On March 21, Keller recorded two assists in the Coyotes' 4–1 win over the Buffalo Sabres, giving him 55 points and 35 assists for the season. Those marks passed Peter Mueller and Max Domi, respectively, for the most of any franchise rookie since the Coyotes relocated from Winnipeg prior to the  season. Keller was named the NHL Rookie of the Month again for March 2018 after finishing the month with 23 goals, 40 assists, and 63 points on the season, all franchise records for a rookie. He finished the season with a team-leading 23 goals and 65 points and tied Derek Stepan with 42 assists. At the Coyotes' end-of-season banquet, he received the Team MVP Award, the Leading Scorer Award, and the Three Star Award. Keller finished third in voting for the 2018 Calder Memorial Trophy, given to the top NHL rookie, behind winner Mathew Barzal and runner-up Brock Boeser.

Keller centered the Coyotes' second line in the first three games of the  season before he was promoted back to the top line wing with Stepan and Richard Panik. At the end of November, the Coyotes acquired Nick Schmaltz from the Chicago Blackhawks, allowing him to center the top line with Keller and Alex Galchenyuk, a line that showed immediate success. By January 2, Keller led the Coyotes with 29 points in 39 games, including a team-leading 21 assists, four game-winning goals, and 13 power play points, and his 96 career points were the most of any Coyotes skater before turning 21. He received his first NHL All-Star Game selection in 2019 as the representative for his team. On January 19, Keller recorded his 100th career point with a goal in Arizona's 3–2 overtime loss to the Pittsburgh Penguins. He reached the milestone in his 132nd NHL game, breaking Max Domi's franchise record of 154 games to 100 points. Keller and Galchenyuk's performance suffered after Schmaltz suffered a season-ending knee injury, but the pair showed some improvement in February after they were partnered with Nick Cousins. For the second year in a row, Keller played in all 82 games of the NHL regular season. finishing his sophomore season with 14 goals and a team-leading 47 points.

On September 4, 2019, the Coyotes signed Keller to an eight-year, $57.2 million contract extension carrying an average annual value (AAV) of $7.15 million. He moved to left wing for the start of the  season, with Stepan centering and newcomer Phil Kessel on the right wing. While facing the Detroit Red Wings on December 22, Keller scored twice and assisted once in the Coyotes' 5–2 victory, becoming the first player in franchise history to record four three-point games before his 22nd birthday. By the end of 2019, his 29 points (10 goals and 19 assists) in 40 games were second on the team, and although Darcy Kuemper was the Coyotes' representative at the 2020 NHL All-Star Game, Keller appeared on the Last Man In ballot, which allowed fans to vote him into one of the final spots of the tournament. The Last Man In for the Central Division that season was ultimately David Perron of the St. Louis Blues. By the time that the COVID-19 pandemic suspended the NHL season in mid-March, Keller had 17 goals and 44 points in 70 games. As part of the league's Return to Play protocols, the Coyotes reached the 2020 Stanley Cup playoffs, facing the Nashville Predators in the qualifying round, and Keller was one of 31 players invited to the playoff quarantine bubble in Edmonton. One of eight Coyotes making his postseason debut in 2020, Keller led his team in scoring with four goals and seven points in nine playoff games before the Colorado Avalanche eliminated Arizona in the second tournament round.

Keller dropped to the Coyotes' third line for the beginning of the  season, playing on newcomer Derick Brassard's left wing with Tyler Pitlick on the right. Facing the Blues on February 9, Keller scored the game-tying goal with 0.7 seconds left in regulation, forcing overtime. The Coyotes won the game 4–3 with shootout goals from Conor Garland and Christian Dvorak. At the start of February, Tocchet placed Keller on a line with Schmaltz and Garland, which he nicknamed the "Short Leash Line" for their high offensive output but poor defense. In the seven consecutive games in which the Coyotes faced the Blues, the Short Leash Line combined for 21 points, with Keller registering three goals and three assists. Playing in all 56 games of the COVID-shortened 2020–21 season, Keller recorded 14 goals and 35 points. He was one of 11 players the Coyotes chose to protect from being taken by the Seattle Kraken in the 2021 NHL Expansion Draft that July.

At the request of his coaches, Keller gained weight during the 2021 offseason, and he entered the  season with a greater physicality and defensive presence. Through his first 24 games, he had six goals, 16 points, 18 penalty minutes, and 15 blocked shots. Included in those 16 points was the 200th of Keller's career, which occurred on November 19 with a third-period assist against the Columbus Blue Jackets. Keller reached the milestone in his 310th career game, becoming the 11th Coyote to register 200 points and the fifth member of the 2016 NHL Draft class to do so. Keller received his second NHL All-Star Game selection in 2022, leading his team with 12 goals and 26 points through 34 games, including two game-winning goals and two overtime goals. Following an injury to Jay Beagle, Keller also became an alternate captain for the Coyotes partway through the 2021–22 season. On March 30, 2022, Keller crashed into the boards during a game against the San Jose Sharks and was taken off the ice on a stretcher. He announced later that he would miss the remainder of the season with a leg injury. At the time of the injury, the Coyotes had been mathematically eliminated from playoff contention, but Keller had a team-leading 63 points, including a career-high 28 goals, in 67 games.

International play

Keller first represented the United States internationally at the 2014 World U-17 Hockey Challenge. He led the tournament in scoring with 13 points in six games, but Team USA finished in second place, losing 2–1 to Russia in the championship game. He won a gold medal the following year at the 2015 IIHF World U18 Championships, with four goals and 11 points in eight games. Although the United States only took bronze at the 2016 IIHF World U18 Championships, Keller had four goals and 14 points in seven games, and he was named the Tournament MVP and a member of the Media All-Star Team.

Keller was selected to the United States junior team for the 2017 World Junior Ice Hockey Championships, scoring two goals in the opening-day 6–1 rout of Latvia. He faced his Arizona teammate Dylan Strome in the gold medal game against Canada, which the United States won 5–4. Keller finished the tournament with a three goals and a team-leading 11 points. Canadian Thomas Chabot was named the tournament MVP, but Keller was named to the All-Star Team.

Three Coyotes played for the United States men's national ice hockey team at the 2017 IIHF World Championship, including Keller. The youngest player in that year's tournament, Keller scored five goals in seven preliminary-round games, including a hat-trick in Team USA's 7–2 victory over Denmark. He finished the tournament with five goals and seven points in eight games as Team USA was shut out 2–0 by Finland in the quarterfinals. He returned to play for the United States two years later at the 2019 IIHF World Championship, He recorded two goals and four points in eight games for the seventh-place United States team.

Personal life
Keller's younger brother Jake is a junior ice hockey player in the North American Hockey League. After playing with the Minnesota Magicians for the 2019–20 season and two years at Wayzata High School, he signed with the New Mexico Ice Wolves for the 2021–22 season.

Career statistics
Statistical information derived from Elite Prospects.

Regular season and playoffs

International

Awards and honors

References

External links
 

1998 births
Living people
American men's ice hockey centers
Arizona Coyotes draft picks
Arizona Coyotes players
Boston University Terriers men's ice hockey players
Ice hockey players from Illinois
Ice hockey people from Missouri
National Hockey League first-round draft picks
People from Chesterfield, Missouri
People from St. Clair County, Illinois
Sportspeople from St. Louis County, Missouri
USA Hockey National Team Development Program players